Rank comparison chart of air forces non-commissioned officers and other personnel of European states.

Other ranks

See also 
 Comparative air force officer ranks of Europe

Notes

References

Europe
Air force ranks
Military comparisons